Flexibacter is a genus of bacteria consisting of some seventeen strains (or species), known for their yellow hue.

Etymology: L. part. adj. flexus (from. L. v. flecto), bent, winding; N.L. masc. n. bacter, rod; N.L. masc. n. Flexibacter, intended to mean flexible rod.

References

Cytophagia
Bacteria genera